is a Japanese original video animation (OVA) series produced by AIC and Pioneer LDC, and released from 1995 to 1997 as three videos. It features character Sasami from the Tenchi Muyo! series as a magical girl, and is noted for recasting the Tenchi Muyo! characters in new roles. It has been dubbed into English by Pioneer USA.  It also spawned two television series - Magical Project S, and Sasami: Magical Girls Club.

Background
Magical Girl Pretty Sammy originated not in animation but in voice drama, beginning in 1993 with the release of Tenchi Muyo! Ryo-ohki CD Special 1 (Creation of the Universe Journey Across Space-Time). Here, Washu's newest invention, the Dimensional Controller, is glitched by the girls, creating several parallel Tenchi! worlds. Stories from the drama would later be adapted for Tenchi Universe's "Time and Space Adventures" arc (episodes 11-13). A second CD release, Tenchi Muyo! Ryo-ohki's Christmas, incorporated ideas revisited again in the series, drawing on Tsunami as the source of Pretty Sammy's magical powers.

The music video for "Pretty Sammy, the Magical Girl", originally part of the Tenchi Muyo! Soundfile, marked Pretty Sammy's anime debut. After having a kiss between her and Tenchi interrupted by the villainous Kiyone, Sasami must transform into her magical alter-ego to save her love and teach his kidnappers a lesson. Though the Soundfile was never released officially in the U.S., this short can be seen during the end credits of the Mihoshi Special.

The Mihoshi Special OVA was the first time Sammy was ever featured as a full-fledged character in the animated medium, and after her appearance in Episode 12 of Tenchi Universe (Tenchi Muyo! TV: Time and Space Adventures Part 2) in a costume that more resembles Sailor Moon's than her original outfit, the magical girl would go on to star in OVA specials and television series of her own.

Overview

Sasami Kawai is a cute young Japanese girl who is asked by magical queen-to-be Tsunami of Juraihelm to become "Magical Girl Pretty Sammy", a champion of justice.  She is constantly harassed by Pixy Misa, an evil, but friendly magical girl created by a rival candidate for queen of the magical world, Ramia.  Sasami is unaware that Pixy Misa is actually her best friend, Misao Amano, who herself is unaware of the transformation forced on her via hypnosis by Ramia's brother, Rumiya.

Collectively, the various Pretty Sammy vehicles spoof the magical girl genre of anime (particularly Sailor Moon, with the "champion of justice" theme), using the characters from AIC's popular Tenchi Muyo! series.  Ryo-Ohki (who is a male in both of the Pretty Sammy series, but a female in Tenchi Muyo! material) is Pretty Sammy's assistant and plays the same role that Luna (of the Sailor Moon series) had done, including keeping the fact he could talk a secret.

Both the OVAs and the TV series are notable for the quality of the musical tracks. Many of the tracks are parodies of popular karaoke tunes.

The other major characters of Tenchi Muyo! appear in various roles in the OVA. They include: Tenchi, Washu, Mihoshi, Kiyone, Ayeka, and Ryoko.

Music
Opening: Chanto Yume o Mimasho! ("Dream Away"; Japanese version performed by Chisa Yokoyama, English version performed by Sharyn Scott)
Ending 1 (episode 1): Baka ("Idiot") [Money No More] (Japanese version performed by Chisa Yokoyama, English version performed by Sharyn Scott)
Ending 2 (episode 2) and Insert Song (episode 1): Ai no Makeikusa ("Losing the Fight of Love"; performed by Rika Matsumoto) and replaced in English version with Your Hiroshi, performed by Diane Michelle)
Ending 3 (episode 3): Mahô no Tobira ("Magical Door"; Japanese version performed by Chisa Yokoyama, English version performed by Sharyn Scott)

Episodes

References

External links

 

1995 anime OVAs
Anime International Company
Geneon USA
Magical girl anime and manga
NBCUniversal Entertainment Japan
Works by Yōsuke Kuroda
Tenchi Muyo! spin-offs
Magical girl parodies